The following is the Men's pole vault indoor world record progression starting from 1889, with additional demonstration and professional records being noted. The best indoor performances on record as agreed to by the world's leading statisticians were accepted as the inaugural Indoor World Records from 1 January 1987; previous to this, they were regarded as world indoor bests. However, the inaugural record in this event was set early in 1987 by Sergey Bubka.

Pre-IAAF

World record progression (since 1966)

Other marks of note

Demonstration

Unsanctioned meeting

Dubious professional records

Professional

References

See also
 List of world records in athletics
 Men's pole vault world record progression

Pole Vault Indoor, men
Pole vault indoor, men
World record men indoor
World record pole vault indoor
Indoor track and field